The Università Popolare degli Studi di Milano (University of the People of Milan) is an unaccredited diploma mill using the word university in its name, located in Milan, Italy.

Ambiguity of the name 
The "Università Popolare degli Studi di Milano" is not to be confused with the Università degli Studi di Milano, which is one of the most important accredited Italian universities, or with the "Università Popolare di Milano" (without "degli Studi"), a historical folk high school established in Milan in 1901, which is no longer active — the "university" claims to be connected with this older institution. In both cases, the name differs by just one word. Besides, the organization sometimes uses the name "Università Popolare di Milano", identical to the latter.

The "university" also claims to own an unaccredited Academy of fine arts of Milan ("Accademia di belle arti di Milano"), not to be confused with the historical and accredited Academy of Fine Arts of Milan.

Degrees 
Università Popolare degli Studi di Milano was created in 2006 by Marco Grappeggia, also known as Marco Edgardo Grappeggia. The organization has no campus or staff, and issues Bachelor's degrees, Master's degrees and even PhDs, based on life experiences. Not being accredited by the Italian Ministry of Education, it is not on the official list of accredited Italian universities.

The issued degrees are orthomolecular and naturopathic medicine, holistic science, political science, sociology, psychology, criminology and criminal investigation, cultural property, international law, sports science, communication science, journalism, economics, marketing and finance, environmental engineering and civil engineering, management engineering, fashion and luxury goods, and others upon request.

Moreover, Università Popolare degli Studi di Milano says that former president of the European Commission and former Italian Prime Minister Romano Prodi received a degree from Università Popolare degli Studi di Milano, represented by Marco Grappeggia, in Vatican City. The date of the alleged commencement is undisclosed. However, Prodi doesn't mention Università Popolare degli Studi di Milano in his official biography, and the video is blurred, which makes it difficult to tell if the person is Prodi or someone else.

Università Popolare degli Studi di Milano's "degrees" also used to be sold by SDL Centrostudi (SDL Study center), a multi-level marketing company that organized bogus class-action lawsuits — against banks that it accused of usury — for which its founders have been indicted for fraud.

Legal status 

The  explains that its degrees are valid because Università Popolare degli Studi di Milano is affiliated with the University of United Popular Nations (UUPN), a limited liability company created by Grappeggia and his wife in Ouagadougou, Burkina Faso in 2012 and allegedly operating in the Ivory Coast as well. UUPN used to have two websites, www.uupn-edu.net and www.uupn.org, which are both inactive and seem to be superseded by www.uupn-edubf.org (in French) and www.unidep-edu.org (in Italian). The  also explains that the African alleged university/corporation can issue degrees in the EU pursuant to the Lisbon Recognition Convention although neither Burkina Faso nor the Ivory Coast belongs to the group of countries that ratified the Lisbon Convention.

In 2011, an Italian former politician, Sen. Guido Viceconte, stated that the degrees issued by the Università Popolare degli Studi di Milano must be recognized in Italy (and the EU); as a consequence, Università Popolare degli Studi di Milano gained popularity after operating under the radar for several years.

Since 2012, Università Popolare degli Studi di Milano has received several cease-and-desist orders from the Italian Ministry of Education, and has been convicted by a final judgment, but most of its websites still advertise the services and the degrees, which are chiefly sold online.

In 2016, the Italian Competition Authority sentenced Università Popolare degli Studi di Milano for false advertising on the web. The Italian Ministry of Education sent cease and desist letters in 2014 and 2016; in retaliation, Università Popolare degli Studi di Milano sued the Ministry of Education and the CIMEA (Information Centre on Academic Mobility and Equivalence), claiming they were "slanderers". In January 2020, the Ministry of Education, together with the Council of agricultural technicians at the Italian Ministry of Justice, issued an official statement saying the Università Popolare degli Studi di Milano's degrees are invalid in Italy (nota MIUR 13 January 2020, prot. n. 646) and the organization is not allowed to offer degrees.

In 2019, Università Popolare degli Studi di Milano took a legal action against the Ministry for University Instruction and Research and against the accredited Niccolò Cusano University, requesting that its award of Masters Degrees should be accepted on the grounds that the Ministry had ignored a certified email and therefore tacit consent should be assumed. In 2021, the court affirmed that Università Popolare degli Studi di Milano is not a university in Italian law, that its degrees are not legally valid there. It dismissed the appeal, requiring the appellant to defray the Ministry's costs in defending the action.

Addresses and websites 

Università Popolare degli Studi di Milano has repeatedly changed its address and/or website. It has declared itself has having branches in Milan, Ostia (Rome), Turin, Cuneo and Loreto, but the addresses are unknown. Università Popolare degli Studi di Milano has also stated, using the name Università Popolare di Milano as a "brand" [sic], that it has a journalism school in New York state, though it is unclear where it is precisely located.

Yorker International University 

The president of the institution, Marco Grappeggia, is also founder and president of the Yorker International University, which is supposed to be based in South Dakota, New York City, Florida and Argentina, but actually operates in Milan, Italy, using the same address as the Università Popolare degli Studi di Milano and even the same email address. The Oregon Office of Degree Authorization and the New York State Education Department made it known that Yorker International University was never accredited. However, Yorker International University used to issue degrees in Italy through Paulo Freire University, a private university located in Nicaragua that was going to be accredited in 2002. Since the Nicaraguan university had (and still has) no authorization to issue degrees in Italy, those degrees are invalid.

Rectors of the Università Popolare degli Studi di Milano

Giuseppe Catapano 
According to the Italian Chamber of Deputies, the first rector Giuseppe Catapano has been arrested for fraud and conspiracy.

Marco Grappeggia 
The founder, current president/director, and former rector Marco Grappeggia (also known as Marco Edgardo Grappeggia) claims to hold a PhD from Columbia Business School in New York City although Columbia University stated he never graduated or received a certificate; he uses the Italian title of "prof." even though he is not a professor according to the Italian Ministry of Education, and claims to be a member of the American Medical Association, the American Psychological Association, the American Marketing Association, and the Government Accreditation Association of Delaware, an accreditation mill. He also claims to have served in the Italian special forces and to have received awards and/or commendations from Jimmy Carter, George W. Bush, Daniel Ortega and US military veterans.

Nicola Crozzoletti

Gianni Neri 
, the current rector is Giovanni or Gianni Neri. In his personal website, he declares himself to be a university professor "as stated in the CINECA MIUR search engine", that is to say the database of the Italian Ministry of Education. Although it is true that the Ministry's database contains a "Giovanni Neri", the entry refers to another Giovanni Neri who actually teaches chemistry at the University of Messina.  (The magnificent rector) declares his area of expertise as criminology, criminal justice, criminal law, comparative law, international law and business law, and that he is "authorized to practice as a lawyer before the Italian supreme courts" (plural). He also declares himself to be a member of an (otherwise unknown) "American Association of Professional Criminologists" in Washington, DC. In Italy, Giovanni Neri is mostly known as the former host of an amateur TV show about hard rock and heavy metal music in the Rome area, together with guitarist Richard Benson.

See also 
 Educational accreditation
 List of unaccredited institutions of higher learning
 List of universities in Italy

References

External links 
 

For-profit universities and colleges in Europe
Unaccredited institutions of higher learning
Distance education institutions based in Italy